is a 2015 Japanese drama film directed by Yukiko Mishima, starring Miki Nakatani and based on a manga series of the same name written and illustrated by Aoi Ikebe.

Plot

Cast
Miki Nakatani
Takahiro Miura
Hairi Katagiri
Haru Kuroki
Hana Sugisaki
Mie Nakao
Masatō Ibu
Kimiko Yo
Mei Nagano

References

External links

2010s Japanese films
Japanese drama films
2015 drama films
2015 films
Live-action films based on manga